Dripsey Castle Bridge is situated  north-east of Coachford village,  north-west of Dripsey village, and is depicted on both the 1841 and 1901 surveyed OS maps. It is located at the meeting point of Carrignamuck and Meeshal townlands, and lies within the civil parish of Magourney and Catholic parish of Aghabullogue.

In the Ordnance Survey name book, it is referred to as a small stone bridge, one-eight of a mile to the south-west of Hayfield House. The National Inventory of Architectural Heritage describes it as a triple-arch humpback road bridge built . It has rubble stone walls, concrete capping to the parapet, arches with dressed stone voussoirs, and v-shaped cutwaters on its east and west elevations. The bridge's name derives from nearby Dripsey Castle, Carrignamuck.

See also
Carrignamuck (townland)
Dripsey Castle, Carrignamuck
Carrignamuck Tower House
Trafalgar Monument, Carrignamuck
Colthurst's Bridge
Larchfield House, Carrignamuck

References

External links
 1841 surveyed OS map (maps.osi.ie)
 1901 surveyed OS map (maps.osi.ie)
 acrheritage.info

Bridges in County Cork